Elenchus maorianus is a parasitic insect species in the genus Elenchus found in New Zealand.

References

External links

Strepsiptera
Insects described in 1953
Insects of New Zealand